Pagalo (PG-51) is a patrol vessel operated by the Venezuelan Coast Guard. When she was commissioned in 2008 she was the first warship built in Venezuela. The vessel was built in the UCOCAR shipyards in Puerto Cabello to a variant of a design from the Damen Group. Other nations operate similar designs, including the  operated by the United States Coast Guard.  According to the think tank Global Security Venezuela's 2606 patrol vessels are armed with six machine guns and a grenade launcher.

President Hugo Chavez officiated at the vessel's commissioning at La Guaira.

References

2008 ships
Patrol vessels of Venezuela